In the theory of radiative transfer, of either thermal or neutron radiation, a position and direction-dependent intensity function is usually sought for the description of the radiation field. The intensity field can in principle be solved from the integrodifferential radiative transfer equation (RTE), but an exact solution is usually impossible and even in the case of geometrically simple systems can contain unusual special functions such as the Chandrasekhar's H-function and Chandrasekhar's X- and Y-functions. The method of discrete ordinates, or the Sn method, is one way to approximately solve the RTE by discretizing both the xyz-domain and the angular variables that specify the direction of radiation. The methods were developed by Subrahmanyan Chandrasekhar when he was working on radiative transfer.

Radiative Transfer Equation 

In the case of time-independent monochromatic radiation in an elastically scattering medium, the RTE is

where the first term on the RHS is the contribution of emission, the second term the contribution of absorption and the last term is the contribution from scattering in the medium. The variable  is a unit vector that specifies the direction of radiation and the variable  is a dummy integration variable for the calculation of scattering from direction  to direction .

Angular Discretization 

Then the scattering integral in the RTE, which makes the solution problematic, becomes a sum

where the numbers  are weighting coefficients for the different direction vectors. With this the RTE becomes a linear system of equations for a multi-index object, the number of indices depending on the dimensionality and symmetry properties of the problem.

Solution 

It is possible to solve the resulting linear system directly with Gauss–Jordan elimination, but this is problematic due to the large memory requirement for storing the matrix of the linear system. Another way is to use iterative methods, where the required number of iterations for a given degree of accuracy depends on the strength of scattering.

Applications 

The discrete ordinates method, or some variation of it, is applied for solving radiation intensities in several physics and engineering simulation programs, such as COMSOL Multiphysics or the Fire Dynamics Simulator.

See also 

 Radiative transfer
 Thermal radiation
 Neutron radiation
 Bickley-Naylor functions

References 

Radiometry
Electromagnetic radiation